The Abia State Ministry of Finance and Economic Development is an Abia State Government ministerial body responsible for general financial management and economic policy of Abia State.

See also
Abia State Government

References

Government ministries of Abia State
Abia